Rhyzobius chrysomeloides is a species of beetle in the family Coccinellidae. R. chrysomeloides is a predatory species, feeding on aphids. R. chrysomeloides can typically be found on various species of trees and garden shrubs, first being recorded in Britain in 1996 on a pine tree. R. chrysomeloides is visually similar to Rhyzoius litura, but can be differentiated by its broader prosternal keel and the darker, U-shaped markings on its elytra.

References

Coccinellidae